The 52nd Regiment Illinois Volunteer Infantry was an infantry regiment that served in the Union Army during the American Civil War.

Service

The 52nd  Illinois Infantry was organized at Geneva, Illinois and mustered into Federal service on November 19, 1861.

The regiment was mustered out on July 5, 1865.

One soldier from the regiment, Sergeant Edward B. Spalding of Company E, was awarded the Medal of Honor for continuing to fight after being wounded at the Battle of Shiloh on April 6, 1862.

Total strength and casualties
The regiment suffered 2 officers and 59 enlisted men who were killed in action or mortally wounded and 119 enlisted men who died of disease, for a total of 180 fatalities.

Commanders
Colonel Isaac G. Wilson - resigned on December 9, 1861.
Colonel Thomas W. Sweeny - promoted brigadier general.
Lieutenant Colonel Edwin A. Bowen - mustered out October 24, 1864.
Lieutenant Colonel Jerome G. Davis - mustered out with the regiment.

See also
List of Illinois Civil War Units
Illinois in the American Civil War

References

External links 

The Civil War Archive

Units and formations of the Union Army from Illinois
Military units and formations established in 1861
1861 establishments in Illinois
Military units and formations disestablished in 1865
Geneva, Illinois